Catherine Elizabeth DeLoof  is an American swimmer.

At the 2020 United States Olympic Trials Deloof finished fifth in the 100 freestyle, qualifying her for the relay team at the 2020 Olympics.

Deloof is a member of the International Swimming League.

She and her two sisters, Ali and Gabby, qualified for the 2016 United States Olympic Trials.

References

1997 births
Living people
American female freestyle swimmers
Universiade medalists in swimming
Universiade gold medalists for the United States
Michigan Wolverines women's swimmers
Medalists at the 2019 Summer Universiade
Swimmers at the 2020 Summer Olympics
Medalists at the 2020 Summer Olympics
Olympic bronze medalists for the United States in swimming
21st-century American women